The  Blue Sky M incident is a maritime incident which took place on 30–31 December 2014 in the Ionian Sea, when a cargo vessel carrying many migrants from Syria and neighbouring states was abandoned by its crew.

Events
 In December 2014, Moldovan-flagged MV Blue Sky M left Korfez, Turkey heading for Rijeka in Croatia.

On 30 December 2014, when the ship was near the island of Othonoi a passenger of the ship called an emergency number for help from a mobile phone. The alarm was raised because of suspected armed people on board, Greek state television reported, claiming that "illegal immigrants" were on the ship. But a coastguard official later said the Greek frigate had contacted the cargo ship's captain, who said the ship was not in any danger and was not requesting assistance. Shortly after this, the vessel changed course and - now headed towards southern Italy - was seemingly abandoned by its crew.

As the ship neared Santa Maria di Leuca, on mainland Italy's southernmost tip, Italian port authorities dispatched two helicopters as a precaution and boarded the ship with a team of six Italian coast guard officials. The team took control of the ship after realising there was no crew to be found. The Italian coast guard said 970 migrants were on board the ship, mostly believed to be Syrians fleeing the country's ongoing civil war, although the actual number of migrants was subsequently revised downwards. The migrants paid thousands of dollars each to smugglers to get them to Europe. The smugglers apparently left the ship's controls on autopilot and then abandoned ship – leaving the Blue Sky M to head towards the Italian coast. The migrants inside did not know what was going on.

Italian coast guard spokesman Filippo Marini was quoted as saying the Italians had averted a disaster by interrupting the programmed route that would have had the ship crash into the shore. "It was a real race against the clock", he said, adding: "Unlocking the engines was a difficult and delicate operation, but they managed to do it."

Italian coastguards docked the ship at the Italian port of Gallipoli. The migrants were taken to local schools and a gymnasium. Thirty-five of them were taken to hospital, with some treated for hypothermia. The Italian Red Cross initially said that four people were found dead on the ship but later withdrew its report.

See also
Ezadeen incident - a very similar incident which occurred just days later
Timeline of the European migrant crisis

References

Maritime incidents in 2014
Maritime incidents related to the European migrant crisis
2014 in Italy
Transport disasters involving refugees of the Arab Winter (2011–present)